Cerillion is a provider of billing, charging and customer management systems, based in the UK. The company was founded in 1999, focusing on a range of industries including telecommunications, finance, utilities and transportation.

The company’s products are used to price and bill subscriptions for a variety of markets. Louis Hall is the current CEO and also the original founder.

History

Louis Hall founded the company in 1999 following the Management Buyout of the in-house Customer Care and Billing product division of Logica.

In 2000, the company partnered up with Isle of Man based Manx Telecom, billing for the world's first commercial UMTS services. This partnership developed further in 2005, with the implementation of its mediation solution in support of Manx Telecom’s new High Speed Downlink Packet Access (HSDPA) network. A year later they also helped Manx Telecom become the first combined fixed and mobile telecommunications company in the world to gain BABT approval for its billing accuracy. And in 2013, the partnership with Manx Telecom was extended again with Cerillion selected as their provider for an online charging system.

In 2006, Cerillion was named one of Britain’ fastest-growing private technology companies in the Sunday Times Microsoft Tech Track 100. In 2007, the company announced that it would be opening a Global Solutions Centre in India. Following their expansion into India, the company also announced they had secured their first contract for Econet Wireless Kenya (now known as Essar Telecom Kenya). During 2008, Cerillion also launched Cerillion Express, and secured a major deal with BTC Bahamas.

2009 saw the launch of Cerillion’s Total Convergence Architecture (TCA) based on the TM Forum’s Application Framework. The two following years saw the company secure a strategic partnership with Nokia Siemens Networks, with the launch of NSN’s Compact UCB solution.

During 2010, the company was awarded a new multi-site cable billing contract with Columbus Communications, followed by major contracts with both M2 Telecommunications and Truphone in 2012.

In 2013, Cerillion introduced a new Software as a Service (SaaS) billing application, Cerillion Skyline, and launched its Cloud Partner Programme.

On 18 March 2016, Cerillion Technologies became a public company by listing on the AIM market.

In 2020, Cerillion announced its BSS automation technologies as part of the project The Edge in Automation Catalyst, set to be revealed in the Catalyst Interactive Showcase at TM Forum on July 7th. Cerillion is investing with Ciena Blue Planet, IBM and Optare Solutions, with AT&T, BT, Orange, Telecom Italia, Telus, Verizon, Videotron and Vodafone championing the network.

External links
 
 Cerillion Skyline

References

Software companies established in 1999
Software companies of the United Kingdom
Companies based in the City of Westminster
1999 establishments in the United Kingdom